Eric Butorac and Jean-Julien Rojer were the defending champions but both decided to participate at the 2012 PTT Thailand Open instead.
Alexander Peya and Bruno Soares prevailed in the final against Colin Fleming and Ross Hutchins, 5–7, 7–5, [10–7].

Seeds

Draw

Draw

References
 Main Draw

Proton Malaysian Open - Doubles
2012 Doubles